Məncəroba (also, Mənçəroba, Mancharoba, and Mandzharoba) is a village in the Khachmaz Rayon of Azerbaijan.  The village forms part of the municipality of Çılğır.

References 

Populated places in Khachmaz District